The pelagic basslet (Howella brodiei) is an oceanic basslet native to the Indo-Pacific, where it occurs at depths from .  This species is an openwater fish, staying deeper (below ) during the day and moving to shallower waters.  This species can reach   in TL.

References

Howellidae